Cyra McFadden (born 1937) is an American writer, who lives on a houseboat in Sausalito, California.

McFadden's 1977 novel The Serial: A Year in the Life of Marin County satirized the trendy lifestyles of the affluent residents of Marin County, California, just north of San Francisco. The book was made into a 1980 movie called Serial, starring Tuesday Weld and Martin Mull.

In 1986, McFadden wrote a positively reviewed personal memoir entitled Rain or Shine: A Family Memoir, in which she described her childhood growing up as the daughter of free-spirited parents.  The book was a finalist for the Pulitzer that year.  Her father, Cy Taillon, was arguably the most famous American rodeo announcer of the mid-20th century.  After being out of print for several years, Rain or Shine was reprinted in 1998.

McFadden wrote a biweekly column for the San Francisco Examiner for six years, mostly in the 1980s, and was also a features writer for that daily newspaper.

She was born in Great Falls, Montana, and spent much of her childhood traveling with her parents on the rodeo circuit and living in Missoula, Montana.

References 

1937 births
Living people
20th-century American novelists
American columnists
20th-century American memoirists
American women novelists
Writers from Montana
Writers from the San Francisco Bay Area
San Francisco Examiner people
People from Sausalito, California
American women memoirists
American women columnists
20th-century American women writers
Journalists from Montana
People from Great Falls, Montana
People from Missoula, Montana
Novelists from California
21st-century American women